The following is a list of recurring Saturday Night Live characters and sketches introduced between September 24, 1977, and May 20, 1978, the third season of SNL.

The Festrunk Brothers ("Two Wild and Crazy Guys!")
A Dan Aykroyd and Steve Martin sketch. The Festrunks, Yortuk (Aykroyd) and Georg (Martin), were two brothers who had emigrated from Czechoslovakia to the United States. Culturally inept, they went to various social hangouts (bars, art exhibits, dance clubs) in an attempt to connect with attractive American women ("foxes"). Their obnoxious behavior was almost always a turn off for the women they approached. They were often referred to by their catchphrase "We are, two wild and crazy guys!!" Debuted September 24, 1977.  In the sketch, they meet two women, Jane Curtin and Gilda Radner, playing ping pong in the basement of their apartment building.

Appearances

The Franken and Davis Show
SNL writing partners Al Franken and Tom Davis hosted their own segment on which they would appear onstage as a comedy team similar to Rowan and Martin, with Davis generally as the straight man and Franken as his self-obsessed, sometimes dimwitted sidekick. They would also perform skits within the context of the segment. The Franken and Davis Show was often a late addition to the broadcast as a time filler if the show was running short. Their best-known skit consisted of Davis appearing in normal dress, while Franken appeared in a flowing garment, with a shaved head and a pony tail and announced he was becoming a Hare Krishna. Davis responded by cutting off the ponytail, angering Franken who said, "Now people will think I'm a Buddhist!" Debuted September 24, 1977.

Aside from The Franken and Davis Show, the two have made several appearances, either separately or as a team, in many SNL sketches throughout the years. They also appear together in the film Trading Places as a pair of bumbling baggage handlers. Al Franken later hosted his own talk show on which Tom Davis has made numerous appearances. Franken, who in 2009 became a U.S. Senator from Minnesota, is probably best known as a performer for his character Stuart Smalley, and for his on-air proposal at the end of the 1970s that the 1980s be known as "The Al Franken Decade."

Appearances

The Ex-Police
Joe and his ex-partner Bob (Dan Aykroyd and Bill Murray) are two cops that were kicked off the force (apparently for being intrusive bigots) that harass the people that live in their apartment building for not living up to their arch-conservative standards (a man and a woman living together without being married, an allegedly lesbian couple, etc.) with disastrous results. Debuted October 15, 1977.

Appearances

Judy Miller
A Gilda Radner character. Judy Miller is a highly energetic school girl playing by herself, pretending she is hosting her own variety talk show. Debuted October 29, 1977.

Joan Face
A Jane Curtin character, a talk show host and moderator.  She hosted four of the five "Consumer Probe" and "On The Spot" sketches, three of the four "What If?" sketches (once billed as "Joan Cage"), the two "More Things to Worry About" sketches with Buck Henry, "Not For Transsexuals Only", and "Heavy Sarcasm".  Debuted October 29, 1977, in "Consumer Probe" opposite Irwin Mainway.

Roseanne Roseannadanna

A Gilda Radner character offering brash, tactless opinions on Weekend Update. Debuted October 29, 1977 in a fake commercial called "Hire The Incompetent", where she protested being fired from a fast food restaurant because her hair kept falling into the hamburgers on a grill.

Appearances

What if?
A talk show sendup that dramatized counterfactual historical situations. Debuted January 21, 1978.

Episodes featuring What If?
 January 21, 1978 (Season 3, Episode 9), "What if Napoleon Had a B-52 Bomber?", hosted by Joan Face (as "Joan Cage")
 November 4, 1978 (Season 4, Episode 4), "What if Eleanor Roosevelt Could Fly?"
 January 27, 1979 (Season 4, Episode 10), "What if Superman Had Landed in Nazi Germany?", hosted by Joan Face
 February 23, 1980 (Season 5, Episode 12), "What if Spartacus Had a Piper Cub?", hosted by Joan Face

Olympia Café ("Cheeseburger, Cheeseburger")

John Belushi is the Greek chef of a greasy spoon diner. Debuted January 28, 1978.

Appearances

The Nerds (Lisa Loopner)

Gilda Radner is Lisa Loopner; Bill Murray is Todd DiLaMuca; Jane Curtin is Lisa's mother. Debuted January 28, 1978.

Appearances

Lester Crackfield
Al Franken is a coal miner. Debuted February 18, 1978.

Point/Counterpoint
A Weekend Update segment, parodying a feature of 60 Minutes, in which Dan Aykroyd and Jane Curtin debate a current events topic. Aykroyd's argument typically begins with "Jane, you ignorant slut." Debuted March 25, 1978.

Appearances

The Blues Brothers

Dan Aykroyd and John Belushi are an American blues and soul revivalist band. Debuted April 22, 1978.

Theodoric of York, Medieval Barber

A Steve Martin sketch. Debuted April 22, 1978.

Father Guido Sarducci

Don Novello plays a chain-smoking, gossiping priest. Debuted May 13, 1978.

Appearances

References

Lists of recurring Saturday Night Live characters and sketches
Saturday Night Live in the 1970s
Saturday Night Live
Saturday Night Live